Kash or KASH may refer to:

Places in Iran
 Kash, Iran, a village in Alborz Province
 Kash, Hormozgan, a village in Hormozgan Province

People

Surname
 Daniel Kash (born 1959), Canadian actor and film director
 Dima Kash (born 1989), Russian-born singer, songwriter and rapper
 Linda Kash (born 1961), Canadian actress

Nickname
 Cassius Marcellus Coolidge (1844–1934), American painter noted for his Dogs Playing Poker series
 Kash Farooq (born 1996), Pakistani-born Scottish boxer
 Kash Heed (born 1955), Canadian former politician and police officer, first Indo-Canadian police chief in Canada
 Kash Patel (born 1980), American attorney and former government official

Stage or ring name
 Kash Doll, American rapper Arkeisha Antoinette Knight
 BRS Kash, American rapper Kenneth Duncan Jr. (born 1993)
 Lady Kash, Singaporean rapper/songwriter Kalaivani Nagaraj (born c. 1990)
 Kid Kash, ring name of American mixed martial artist and professional wrestler David Tyler Cash (born 1969)

Radio stations
 KASH-FM, licensed to Anchorage, Alaska, United States
 KOPB (AM), licensed to Eugene, Oregon, United States, which had the call sign KASH until April 1985

Other uses
 KASH (software), the command line interface of the KANT computer algebra system
 KASH domain, the conserved C-terminal protein regions
 Slang term among cannabis users for hashish covered with kief
 Nashua Municipal Airport in Nashua, New Hampshire, United States
 Kash or Kans grass, Saccharum spontaneum, a tall grass used for thatching and fencing in South Asia
 Kash, a character in many GEICO commercials from the late 2000s to the early 2010s

See also
Kaas (disambiguation)
Kas (disambiguation)

Lists of people by nickname